Kelly Hall may refer to:
 
J. Kelly Hall, women's basketball coach 
Kelly Hall (University of Chicago)

See also
Arthell Kelly Hall, University of Southern Mississippi